Serine/threonine-protein kinase D2 or PKD2 is an enzyme that in humans is encoded by the PRKD2 gene.

Function 

The protein encoded by this gene belongs to the protein kinase D (PKD) family of serine/threonine protein kinases, a subfamily of protein kinase c. This kinase can be activated by phorbol esters as well as by gastrin via the cholecystokinin B receptor (CCKBR) in gastric cancer cells. It can bind to diacylglycerol (DAG) in the trans-Golgi network (TGN) and may regulate basolateral membrane protein exit from TGN. Alternative splicing results in multiple transcript variants encoding different isoforms.

References

Further reading

EC 2.7.11